Heptranchias howelli, the sevengill shark, is a nektonic carnivore in the genus Heptranchias. It is an extinct species that ranged from 37.2 to 20.43 Ma.

Fossil record 
Teeth from Heptranchias howelli have been found in Europe. An antero-lateral tooth and  an upper lateral tooth were found in Faxe, Denmark in 2014 . In addition, two incomplete antero-lateral teeth and an upper anterior tooth are kept in a private collection. A 2015 study in  yielded a complete lower tooth, 17 incomplete lower teeth, and an unidentified broken tooth.

Description

Teeth 
The upper lateral teeth of the species have a long, acute, strongly sigmoid main cusp. This cusp is serrated and has a dispal cusplet. The main cusp of the antero-lateral teeth is triangular and carries eight mesial cusplets that increase in size along the lower mesial face. The antero-lateral teeth have six main cusplets, the sixth of which is very small. The first cusplet is slightly lower than the others. The cusps are inclined at about a 45 degree angle distally.

The largest tooth found in Trelde Naes was  mesio-distally,  apico-basally and  labio-langually.

Distribution 
Fossils of Heptranchias howelli have been found in:

Eocene
 Antarctica
 Canada (British Columbia)
 United States (New Jersey, Oregon, Washington)

Miocene
 Uitpa Formation, Cocinetas Basin, Colombia

References 

Heptranchias
Eocene animals of North America
Paleogene United States
Fossils of Antarctica
Paleogene Canada
Fossils of British Columbia
Miocene animals of South America
Neogene Colombia
Fossils of Colombia
Fossil taxa described in 1946